Anton Ingolič (5 January 1907 – 11 March 1992) was a Slovene writer, playwright, and editor. 
He is best known for his novels and youth literature.

Ingolič was born in Spodnja Polskava near Slovenska Bistrica in the Austro-Hungarian Duchy of Styria (present-day eastern Slovenia). He went to the local school and completed his secondary education in Maribor before studying in Ljubljana and Paris. He worked as a secondary-school Slovene and French language teacher in Ptuj, Maribor, and Ljubljana. 
He was editor of the journal Nova Obzorja and became a member of the Slovenian Academy of Sciences and Arts in 1976.

He won the Prešeren Award twice, in 1949 for his novel Pot po nasipu and in 1978 for his literary opus for youth and adults. Between 1961 and 1963 he was president of the Slovene Writers' Association.

The primary school in Spodnja Polskava is named after Ingolič.

Published works

Young adult literature 
 Udarna brigada (1946)
 Deček z dvema imenoma (1955)
 Tvegana pot (1955)
 Tačko v velikem svetu (1957)
 Tajno društvo PGC (1958)
 Mladost na stopnicah (1962)
 Enajstorica živih (1964)
 Gimnazijka (1967)
 Deklica iz Chicaga (1969)
 Zgodbe vesele in žalostne (1971)
 Potopljena galeja (1973)
 Diamanti, ribe in samovar (1974)
 Deklica na sončnem žarku (1976)
 Ptiček brez kljunčka (1977)
 Srečanje s podvodnim konjem (1978)
 Bila sem izgnanka (1979)
 Zgodbe mojega jutra (1979)
 Moje pisateljevanje (1980)
 Velika stavka (1980)
 Zaupno (1981)
 Nemir mladostnika (1982)
 Rokove zgodbice (1983)
 Čudovita pot (1986)
 Leta dozorevanja (1987)

Prose for adults
 Mlada leta (1935)
 Lukarji (1936)
 Soseska (1939)
 Na splavih (1940)
 Matevž Visočnik (1941)
 Pred sončnim vzhodom (1945)
 Vinski vrh (1946)
 Pot po nasipu (1948)
 Na prelomu (1950)
 Stavka (1951)
 Človek na meji (1952)
 Sončna reber (1953)
 Tam gori za hramom (1956)
 Ugasla dolina (1956)
 Kje ste, Lamutovi? (1958)
 Vidim te, Veronika! (1959)
 Črni labirinti (1960)
 Nebo nad domačijo (1960)
 Oči (1962)
 Pri naših v Ameriki (1964)
 Lastovka čez ocean (1966)
 Sibirska srečanja (1966)
 Šumijo gozdovi domači (1969)
 Pretrgana naveza (1971)
 Delovni dan sestre Marje (1980)
 Obračun (1982)
 Človek, ne jezi se! (1984)
 Podobe njenega življenja (1985)
 Zgodilo se je (1986)
 Družinski festival (1988)
 Poslavljanje (1989)
 Tako je bilo (1992)
 Črni kurent (1993)

 Historical novels
 Mlatilnica-Lovorjev venec (1948)
 Likof-Mejnik (1950)
 Našli so se (1952)
 Pradedje (1975)
 Gorele so grmade (1977)

References

1907 births
1992 deaths
People from the Municipality of Slovenska Bistrica
People from the Duchy of Styria
Slovenian dramatists and playwrights
Slovenian writers
Slovenian editors
20th-century dramatists and playwrights
Presidents of the Slovene Writers' Association
Members of the Slovenian Academy of Sciences and Arts
Levstik Award laureates